Petropavlovsky District is the name of several administrative and municipal districts in Russia:
Petropavlovsky District, Altai Krai, an administrative and municipal district of Altai Krai
Petropavlovsky District, Voronezh Oblast, an administrative and municipal district of Voronezh Oblast

See also
Petropavlovsky (disambiguation)

References